Mohammad Muddassir (born 29 November 1992) is an Indian cricketer. He made his List A debut for Hyderabad in the 2016–17 Vijay Hazare Trophy on 6 March 2017. He made his first-class debut for Hyderabad in the 2017–18 Ranji Trophy on 17 November 2017, taking five wickets for 36 runs in the first innings.

References

External links
 

1992 births
Living people
Indian cricketers
Hyderabad cricketers